The Liver of Piacenza is an Etruscan artifact found in a field on September 26, 1877, near Gossolengo, in the province of Piacenza, Italy, now kept  in the Municipal Museum of Piacenza, in the Palazzo Farnese.

It is a life-sized bronze model of a sheep's liver covered in Etruscan inscriptions (TLE 719), measuring 126 × 76 × 60 mm (5 × 3 × 2.4 inches)  and dated to the late 2nd century BC, i.e. a time when the Piacenza region would already have been Latin-dominated (Piacenza was founded in 218 BC as a Roman garrison town in Cisalpine Gaul).

Description
The liver is subdivided into sections for the purposes of performing haruspicy (hepatoscopy); the sections are inscribed with names of individual  Etruscan deities.

The Piacenza liver is a striking conceptual parallel to clay models of sheep's livers known from the Ancient Near East, reinforcing the evidence of a  connection (be it by migration or merely by cultural contact) between the Etruscans and the Anatolian cultural sphere. A Babylonian clay model of a sheep's liver dated to the Middle Bronze Age is preserved in the British Museum. The Piacenza liver parallels the Babylonian artifact by representing the major anatomical features of the liver (the gall bladder, caudate lobe and posterior vena cava) as sculpted protrusions.

The outer rim of the Piacenza liver is divided into 16 sections; since according to the testimony of  Pliny and Cicero, the Etruscans divided the heavens into 16 astrological houses, it has been suggested that the liver is supposed to represent a model of the cosmos, and its parts should be identified as constellations or astrological signs. Each of the 16 houses was the "dwelling place" of an individual deity. Seers would e.g. draw conclusions from the direction in which lightning was seen. Lightning in the east was auspicious, lightning in the west inauspicious (Pliny 2.143f.). Stevens (2009) surmises that Tin, the main god of lightning, had his dwelling due north, as lightning in the north-east was most lucky, lightning in the north-west most unlucky, while lightning in the southern half of the compass was not as strong an omen (Servius ad. Aen. 2.693). The deciphering of the complex content of the Liver of Piacenza was the subject of two scientific monographs by the University of Bologna researcher Antonio Gottarelli, published between 2017 and 2018. These books represent the most complete analysis of its content and they reveal its nature of a handheld instrument for the digital calculation of a liturgical-ritual calendar. Its dating would be at fourth century BC and the position of place of discovery at 45° of latitude would be consistent with its instrumental use.

The theonyms are abbreviated and in many cases, the reading even of the abbreviation is disputed. As a result, there is a consensus for the interpretation of individual names only in a small number of cases. The reading given below is that of Morandi (1991) unless otherwise indicated:

circumference:
 tin[ia] /cil/en     
 tin[ia]/θvf[vlθas]
 tins/θ neθ[uns]
 uni/mae uni/ea (Juno? Maia?)
 tec/vm  (Cel? Tellus?)
 lvsl
 neθ[uns]  (Neptunus)
 caθ[a] (Luna?)
 fuflu/ns   (Bacchus)
 selva (Silvanus)
 leθns
 tluscv
 celsc
 cvl alp
 vetisl (Veiovis?)
 cilensl
interior: 

Two words are on the bottom side of the artefact:
 tivs  (or tivr "Moon" or "Month"?))
 usils ("of the sun" or "of the day")

See also
 Etruscan religion

Notes

Further reading
C. Thulin (1906) Die Götter des martianus capella und die Bronzeleber fon Piacenza, Giessen, Töpelmann.
L.B. Van der Meer (1987) The bronze liver of Piacenza: Analysis of a Polytheistic Structure, Amsterdam: J.C. Gieben.
Alessandro Morandi (1991) Nuovi lineamenti di lingua etrusca, Massari.
Natalie L. C. Stevens (April 2009) A New Reconstruction of the Etruscan Heaven American Journal of Archaeology 113.22,  153-164.
Antonio Gottarelli (2017) Cosmogonica. Il fegato di Tiāmat e la soglia misterica del Tempo. Dai miti cosmologici del Vicino Oriente antico ad una nuova interpretazione del fegato etrusco di Piacenza, collana di "Archeologia del Rito", n.2, Te.m.p.l.a., Bologna.
Antonio Gottarelli (2018) Padānu. Un’ombra tra le mani del tempo. La decifrazione funzionale del fegato etrusco di Piacenza, collana di "Archeologia del Rito", n.3, Te.m.p.l.a., Bologna. 

2nd-century BC inscriptions
2nd-century BC sculptures
1877 archaeological discoveries
Etruscan artefacts
Etruscan mythology
Etruscan inscriptions
Piacenza
Bronze sculptures in Italy
Juno (mythology)
Luna (goddess)
Mars (mythology) in art
Saturn (mythology)
Liver